Events from the year 1722 in Scotland.

Incumbents 

 Secretary of State for Scotland: The Duke of Roxburghe

Law officers 
 Lord Advocate – Robert Dundas
 Solicitor General for Scotland – John Sinclair, jointly with Charles Binning

Judiciary 
 Lord President of the Court of Session – Lord North Berwick
 Lord Justice General – Lord Ilay
 Lord Justice Clerk – Lord Grange

Events 
 7 May – Tranent to Cockenzie Waggonway construction begins.
 Signet Library established in Edinburgh.
 Pheasant introduced to Scotland.
 Possible date – Burning of Janet Horne as a witch – see 1727 in Scotland.

Births 
 26 January – Alexander Carlyle, Church of Scotland leader (died 1805)
 4 May – Robert McQueen, Lord Braxfield, judge (died 1799)
 13 September – John Home, Episcopalian minister, playwright and writer (died 1808)
 16 September – Gabriel Christie, British Army general and settler in Quebec (died 1799 in Canada)
 1 December – Dunbar Douglas, 4th Earl of Selkirk, Scottish peer (died 1799)
 date unknown
 John Brown of Haddington, theologian (died 1787)
 Flora MacDonald, Jacobite (died 1790)
 Robert Smith, architect working in America (died 1777 in the United States)

Deaths 
 28 February – William Kerr, 2nd Marquess of Lothian, army officer (born 1661)
 9 August – Robert Sibbald, polymath (born 1641)

The arts
 William Aikman paints a portrait of the poet Allan Ramsay.
 Physician Archibald Pitcairne writes the comedy The Assembly, or Scotch Reformation.

See also 

 Timeline of Scottish history

References 

 
Years of the 18th century in Scotland
Scotland
1720s in Scotland